Dysart railway station served the burgh of Dysart, Fife, Scotland from 1847 to 1969 on the Edinburgh and Northern Railway.

History 
The station opened on 20 September 1847 by the Edinburgh and Northern Railway. The goods yard was to the east and the signal box was to the northwest, opposite sidings which served Frances Colliery. The station closed on 6 October 1969.

References

External links 

Disused railway stations in Fife
Former North British Railway stations
Railway stations in Great Britain opened in 1847
Railway stations in Great Britain closed in 1969
1847 establishments in Scotland
1969 disestablishments in Scotland